Lillian Pulitzer Rousseau (November 10, 1931 – April 7, 2013) was an American entrepreneur, fashion designer, and socialite. She founded Lilly Pulitzer, Inc., which produces floral print clothing and other wares.

Career

Lilly and husband Herbert Pulitzer settled in Palm Beach, Florida, shortly after their marriage. They owned several Florida orange groves and, with produce from these, she opened a fruit juice stand on Via Mizner in Palm Beach. While working at the stand, Pulitzer found that squeezing juice made a mess of her clothes. Seeking to camouflage the juice stains, Lilly asked her dressmaker to design a dress that would camouflage the stains. She discovered that customers loved her dress, so she produced more to sell at her juice stand. Eventually, she was selling more dresses than juice, and decided to focus on designing and selling what had become known as her "Lillys".

In 1959, Pulitzer became president of her own company, Lilly Pulitzer, Inc. The company's main factory was in Miami, Florida, and the fabrics were produced by the Key West Hand Print Fabrics company in Key West. Over 85% of Pulitzer's prints were designed by Suzie Zuzek, the designer for Key West Hand Prints. From the 1960s to the early 1980s, Pulitzer's bright, colorful clothes were very popular, worn by people such as former classmate Jacqueline Kennedy Onassis and her daughter Caroline Kennedy; and members of the Rockefeller, Vanderbilt and Whitney families.  After Jackie was featured in Life wearing one of Lilly's shifts, many preppy ladies followed her lead. The Jacqueline dress is one of Lilly Pulitzer's most successful styles. Lilly later stated that the first shift dress Jackie was photographed in was made of kitchen curtains. By 1984, Lilly closed down the entire clothing operation.

Revival of the brand
In 1993, the rights to the brand were purchased by Sugartown Worldwide, Inc. They contacted Pulitzer with the hopes of reviving the brand because "they just loved Lilly, their mothers and sisters loved Lilly, and they wanted to bring the line back", Pulitzer said.

Today, the company maintains 75 Lilly Pulitzer Signature Stores (also known as Via Shops).

The brand, carried by 23 company-owned retail stores, also sells to independently owned shops and major department stores, such as Belk, Lord and Taylor, Nordstrom, Saks Fifth Avenue, and Neiman Marcus. On December 21, 2010, Sugartown Worldwide, Inc. was purchased by Oxford Industries, Inc.

In April 2015, Target announced a collaboration with Lilly Pulitzer. Within hours, the collection was almost entirely sold out, in stores and online.

Products

Along with women's clothing, the company also produces children's clothing, swim, shoes, jewelry, accessories, bedding (revived in 2010), and stationery. Lilly never wanted to produce clothing that was suited for the colder months. "It's always summer somewhere", she was quoted as saying. In accordance with Pulitzer's reported preferences, the dress was to be worn with bare feet and was lined, in order not to require underwear. The company launched an exclusive Bridal Collection in 2010. With everything Lilly does she follows the motto "Everything is possible with sunshine and a little pink", which very accurately represents her fun and vibrant fabric designs.

To honor the original Lilly Pulitzer juice stand and store, the Worth Avenue store in Palm Beach holds exclusive and custom designs that can be created with a choice of print.

Pulitzer published a pair of lifestyle books—Essentially Lilly: A Guide to Colorful Entertaining and Essentially Lilly: A Guide to Colorful Holidays—with author Jay Mulvaney. She also released two desk calendar books, Essentially Lilly 2005 Social Butterfly Engagement Calendar and Essentially Lilly 2006 Party Animal Engagement Calendar. She was known to make special collections with sorority prints on them. She has held contests on her Facebook page to vote on which sororities will get their own prints. In 2014, Lilly Pulitzer stopped the production of sorority printed items.

Personal life
In 1950, she eloped with Herbert (Peter) Pulitzer Jr., grandson of Joseph Pulitzer (publisher after whom the Pulitzer Prize is named). The couple had three children: Peter, Minnie and Liza. In 1969, Lilly and Peter were divorced. She married Enrique Rousseau shortly thereafter. Although she legally changed her name to Lillian McKim Rousseau, her clothing company continued to operate under the "Lilly Pulitzer" label. She continued to reside in Palm Beach, Florida. Enrique Rousseau died of cancer in 1993.

Death
On April 7, 2013, aged 81, Pulitzer Rousseau died at her home in Palm Beach, Florida.

Cultural impact
Lisa Birnbach's tongue-in-cheek guides, The Official Preppy Handbook and its sequel True Prep: It's a Whole New Old World, feature Lilly Pulitzer clothing as must-have items for "preppy" women. 
The Museum of Lifestyle & Fashion History in Boynton Beach, Florida, ran an exhibit from August 2010 through May 2011 about the clothing and designs of Lilly Pulitzer. Museum director Lori Durante stated "Lilly Pulitzer fashion is relative to the American experience ... [it] is relevant to Palm Beach County, to Florida."
In 1966, The Washington Post reported that the dresses were "so popular that at the Southampton Lilly shop on Job's Lane they are proudly put in clear plastic bags tied gaily with ribbons so that all the world may see the Lilly of your choice. It's like carrying your own racing colors or flying a yacht flag for identification."

Gallery

References

External links
 Official website
 Lilly Pulitzer Home at Garnet Hill

American fashion designers
American socialites
Bostwick family
American fashion businesspeople
Phipps family
People from Palm Beach, Florida
People from Roslyn, New York
Artists from New York City
Lilly
Re-established companies
1931 births
2013 deaths
Chapin School (Manhattan) alumni
Miss Porter's School alumni
Finch College alumni
1980s fashion
1970s fashion
1960s fashion
1950s fashion